Nicholas Daryl Magaña Defago (born 18 June 1996) is a Peruvian swimmer. He competed in the men's 100 metre freestyle event at the 2016 Summer Olympics.

References

External links
 

1996 births
Living people
Swimmers from California
American sportspeople of Peruvian descent
Citizens of Peru through descent
Peruvian male freestyle swimmers
Olympic swimmers of Peru
Swimmers at the 2016 Summer Olympics
Place of birth missing (living people)